Juliet Sorci (born July 4, 1979) is an American actress best known for her numerous roles as a child actress.

Early life
Born and raised in Bakersfield, California, Sorci graduated from William S. Hart High School in Santa Clarita in 1997.

Career
Sorci studied with many acting teachers which include Howard Fine, Lesly Kahn, and Stan Kirsch; she also studied the Alexander Technique with Jean-Louis Rodrigue and  Kristof Konrad and voice control with Robert Corff. Starting out in Hollywood as a child actress, Sorci has appeared in guest roles on numerous TV shows, which include Quantum Leap, The Tracey Ullman Show, Baywatch, In The Heat of the Night (1993). After a 12 year pause, she returned in her first adult role, in a 2005 episode of  Zoey 101.

Personal life
, Sorci lived in Los Angeles with her husband Ian Duncan (whom she married in 2011) and their daughter, Cosette.

Filmography

References

External links 
 
 

1979 births
Living people
Actresses from Bakersfield, California
American television actresses
American film actresses
American child actresses
20th-century American actresses
21st-century American actresses